Chen Yuh-chang (born 18 September 1955) is a politician in the Republic of China. He was the Chairperson of the Financial Supervisory Commission (FSC) of the Executive Yuan from 2010 to 2013.

Financial Supervisory Commission Chairmanship

Day trader requirements
At the end of May 2013, Chen said that the FSC planned to establish regulations to impose margin requirements for day or pattern traders to ensure a form of safeguard against risk associated with day trading, as, he claimed, had been done by most of the developed countries around the world.

Publications
A Study of the Computerization of the Security and Stock Market
A Study of the Clearance Systems of the Security and Stock Market

References

1955 births
Living people
Mayors of Taipei
Kuomintang politicians in Taiwan
Place of birth missing (living people)